"Reckoner" is a song by the English rock band Radiohead, released on their seventh album, In Rainbows (2007). It was produced by Nigel Godrich and developed while Radiohead were working on another song, "Feeling Pulled Apart by Horses".

"Reckoner" was named one of the best songs of the decade by Pitchfork and NME. Remixes were released by James Holden, Flying Lotus and Diplo. Radiohead released the separate stems for fans to remix, as they had done with their 2008 single "Nude". "Reckoner" reached number 74 on the UK Singles Chart.

Recording
On tour in 2001, Radiohead performed a different song with the title "Reckoner". Pitchfork described it as "droning rocker", and Rolling Stone wrote that it featured "one of the loudest and most sinister riffs in Radiohead's catalog". Working on this song for their 2007 album In Rainbows, Radiohead wrote a coda that developed into a different song, but kept the "Reckoner" title.

Radiohead's producer, Nigel Godrich, recalled of the recording sessions: "People [were] all over the house, shaking things and getting this groove going, then chopping it up into little pieces and putting it back together. It was a lot of fun."

In 2009, the singer, Thom Yorke, released the original "Reckoner" song as a solo single, "Feeling Pulled Apart by Horses".

Composition 
"Reckoner" features Yorke's falsetto, "frosty, clanging" percussion, a "meandering" guitar line, piano, and a string arrangement by the guitarist Jonny Greenwood. Yorke said the guitar riff was a homage to the Red Hot Chili Peppers guitarist John Frusciante, "in my sort of clunky 'can't-really-pick' kind of way". He described the song as "kind of a love song ... Sort of."

Release 
"Reckoner" was released on Radiohead's 2007 album In Rainbows. As they had done for their single "Nude", on September 28, 2008, Radiohead released the separate "Reckoner" stems for fans to purchase and remix. Fans could upload their remixes to the Radiohead website and vote for their favourites. Radiohead also had the electronic musicians James Holden, Flying Lotus and Diplo create remixes.

After the stems were released for sale, "Reckoner" reached number 74 on the UK Singles Chart. It did not enter the US Billboard Hot 100, but peaked at number 21 on the Bubbling Under Hot 100 Singles chart, a 25-song extension of the Hot 100. A performance of "Reckoner" was included on the 2008 live video In Rainbows – From the Basement.

Music video 
The "Reckoner" music video was created by Clement Picon, who won a competition held by Radiohead and Aniboom to create an animation for a song from In Rainbows. Yorke described it as "one of my favourite video things that has ever happened".

Reception 
Reviewing In Rainbows, Pitchfork wrote that "Reckoner" was not the "most immediate track", but that after several listens "it reveals itself to be among the most woozily beautiful things the band has ever recorded". In October 2011, Rolling Stone readers voted it the ninth-best Radiohead song, and NME ranked it the 93rd-best track of the previous 15 years. Pitchfork named it the 254th-greatest song of the decade. In 2020, the Guardian named "Reckoner" the third-best Radiohead song, writing: "At first innocuous, 'Reckoner' unspools a full house of virtuoso performances engulfed by Godrich’s winter-blanket production. It soothes then soars."

Personnel
Adapted from the In Rainbows liner notes.

Radiohead
 Colin Greenwood
 Jonny Greenwood
 Ed O'Brien
 Philip Selway
 Thom Yorke

Production
 Nigel Godrich – production, mixing, engineering
 Richard Woodcraft – engineering
 Hugo Nicolson – engineering
 Dan Grech-Marguerat – engineering
 Graeme Stewart – preproduction
 Bob Ludwig – mastering

Artwork
 Stanley Donwood
 Dr Tchock

Charts

Certifications

References

2007 songs
Radiohead songs
Rock ballads
XL Recordings singles
Song recordings produced by Nigel Godrich
Songs written by Thom Yorke
Songs written by Colin Greenwood
Songs written by Jonny Greenwood
Songs written by Philip Selway
Songs written by Ed O'Brien